Notiohyphantes is a genus of dwarf spiders that was first described by Alfred Frank Millidge in 1985.

Species
 it contains three species:
Notiohyphantes excelsus (Keyserling, 1886) – Mexico to Peru, Brazil, Galapagos Is.
Notiohyphantes laudatus Millidge, 1991 – Brazil
Notiohyphantes meridionalis (Tullgren, 1901) (type) – Chile

See also
 List of Linyphiidae species (I–P)

References

Araneomorphae genera
Linyphiidae
Spiders of North America
Spiders of South America